Mes trésors is a 2017 French comedy film directed by Pascal Bourdiaux.

Plot
A high-profile burglar gathers his two daughters to prepare a final break.

Cast
 Jean Reno as Patrick
 Reem Kherici as Caroline
 Camille Chamoux as Carole
 Pascal Demolon as Romain
 Alexis Michalik as Guillaume
 Bruno Sanches as Fred
 Natalia Verbeke as Julianna Van Gaal
 Jean Reynès as Wladimir Daroff

References

External links
 
 

2017 films
2017 comedy films
French comedy films
2010s French-language films
Films set in France
French heist films
2010s French films